The total primary energy consumption of the Philippines in 2012 was 30.2 Mtoe (million Tonnes of oil equivalent), most of which came from fossil fuels. Electricity consumption in 2010 was 64.52 TWh, of which almost two-thirds came from fossil fuels, 21% from hydroelectric plants, and 13% from other renewable sources. The total generating capacity was 16.36 GW.

The population of the Philippines is over 101 million people, and as a rapidly developing nation, has seen a rapid increase in GDP, averaging  6.1% from 2011 to 2015.
Energy-intensive manufacturing and retail industries are the driving factors of the Philippines' economic growth.
Given its large population and rapidly growing economy, the country's energy needs are significant and growing rapidly. According to the Philippines Department of Energy, the Philippines consumed 75,266 gigawatt-hours (GWh) of electricity in 2013. 
Of this, 27.39% went to powering residential areas, 24.31% to commercial establishments and 27.46% to the industrial sector. With 72.84% of electrical energy being consumed by Luzon, 14.75% by Visayas, and 12.41% by Mindanao in 2013.

Electricity

The Philippines’ demand for electrical energy in 2013 represents a 42.17% increase from 2012, when the demand for energy was at 52,941 GWh. It is expected that the country’s demand for power will increase as the Philippines’ population and economy continue to grow.

The Philippines’ current energy mix highly favors fossil fuels, with coal, natural gas, and oil, accounting for 73.56% of the country's total electrical energy needs, primarily due to their low cost.

The Philippines's most heavily used energy source is coal. Of the country’s 75,266 GWh electrical energy demand in 2013, 32,081 GWh or approximately 42.62% was sourced from coal. This heavy dependence on coal is signified by the high number of coal-fired power plants in the country. As of March 2016, there were 32 coal-fired power generation facilities connected to the energy grid. These facilities are spread throughout the country, although most of them are in Luzon and Visayas. The number of coal-fired power plants in the country is set to increase by 25 by the year 2030 to keep up with the Philippines’ growing energy demands.

Besides coal, the Philippines is also heavily dependent on natural gas. The Philippines produced 18,791 GWh of electricity from natural gas in 2013. This corresponded to 24.97% of the Philippines’ electrical energy needs during this period. As of March 2016, there were a total of 13 natural gas generation facilities connected to the energy grid, 12 of which are in Luzon and one of which is in Cebu on Visayas.

The Philippines also generates a significant amount of electrical energy from oil, albeit to a lesser degree than compared to coal and natural gas. In 2013, the Philippines sourced 5.97% of its energy from oil-based sources. As of March 2016, there were a total of 212 gas and diesel-powered facilities in the Philippines. The large number of oil-powered power plants is a result of a lower per plant output compared to coal and natural gas. Oil-powered power plants can be found dispersed across several provinces in Luzon, Visayas, and Mindanao.

The Philippines also benefits from sharing of surplus energy supply from Visayas geothermal fields thru Leyte-Luzon HVDC interconnection since 1998. The on-going Mindanao-Visayas Interconnection will greatly share to the energy needs of the country as it abundance with Hydro-Electric during rainy seasons. The project is set to operate early 2022.

Renewable energy 

The Government of the Philippines has introduced various policies to foster renewable energy. Some of the policies provide an income tax holiday up to seven years, duty-free import of equipment for renewable energy technologies, etc. In 2012, the government launched the new feed-in tariff (FIT).

See also 

 Environmental issues in the Philippines

References